

S 

 List of sub chasers (SC-1 through SC-1634)
 
 
 
 
 
 
 
 
 
 
 
 
 
 
 
 
 
 
 
 
 
 
 
 
 
 
 
 
 
 
 
 
 
 
 
 
 
 
 
 
 
 
 
 
 
 
 
 
 
 
 
 
 
  (/)
 

Sab–Sam 

 
 
 
 
 
 
 
  (/)
 
 
 
 
 
 
 
 
 
 
 
 
  (/)
 
  (/)
 
 
  (/)
  (/)
  (/)
 
  (/)
 
 
 
 
 
  (//)
  (/)
  (/)
 
 
  (///)
  (//)
  (/)
 
 
 
 
 
  (/)
  (/)
 
 
 
 
  (1864)
 
 
  (//)
 
  (/)
 
  (/)
  (/, /)
  (/)
  (/)
  (/)
 
  (/)
 
 
 
 
  (/)
 
  (/)
 
 
 
  (/)
 
 
 
 
 
 

San 

 
 
 
 
 
 
  (/, /, /)
 
  (/)
  (//)
 
 
  (/)
  (/)
 
 
 
 
  (/)
  (/)
 
 
 
 
 
 
 
 
  (/)
  (//)
 
  (/)
  (/, /)
  (/)
  (/)
 
  (///)
 
 
 
 
  
  (Launch #164, /)
 
 
 
 
 
 
  
 
  
  
 
 
 
 
 
  (////)
 
 

Sap–Say 

 
 
 
 
  (/)
 
 
 
 
  (/)
  (/)
  (/, /)
 
  (/)
 
  (///)
 
 
 
 
  (/)
  (//)
  (//)
  (/)
  (//)
 
 
  (/)
  (/)
 
 
  (/)
 
 
  (//)
  (/)
  (///)
 
 
  (/)
  (/)
  (/)
  (//)
 
 
 
 

Sc–Sel 

 
 
 
 
 
 
  (/)
 
 
  (/)
 
  (/)
  (/)
  (/)
 
 
 
 
  (//)
 
  (/)
 
 
  (/)
  (/, /)
 
 
  (/)
 
  (/)
  (/)
 
  (/)
 
 
  (/)
 
 SDTS (ex-DDG-31)

Sea 

 
  (/)
  (DSV-4)
 
  (/)
  (/)
 
 
 
 
 
 
 
 
 
 
 
  (/)
 
  (/)
 
  (/)
 
 
 
 
  (/)
  (//, /)
  (/)
 
  (/)
  (/)
  (/)
  (/)
  (/)
  (/)
  (/)
  (/)
  (/)
  (///)
 
 
 
  (/)
 
  (//)
 
 
 
 

Seb–Sg 

 
 
 
  (/)
  (/)
 
 
 
 
 
 
 
  (//)
 
 
  (//)
 
 
 
 
 
  (/)
 
  (/)
  (/)
  (/)
 
  (/)
 
 
  (/)
  (/)
 
 
 
 
 
 
  (/)
 USS Seringapatm (1813))
 
  (//)
 
 
 
 
 
  (/)
 
 
 
 
 
 
  (/)
 
 
  (/)
 
  (/)
 
 
 
 
 
 

Sh–Sho 

 
 
 
 
 
 
 

  (/)
  (/)
  (/)
  (/)
  (/)
 
 
  (//)
 
  (//)
 
 
  (/)
 
 
 
 
 
  (/)
 
  (//)
 
  (/)
 
 
 
 
  (/)
 
 
  (/)
  (/)
 
 
 
 
  (/)
 
 
 
  (/)
 
 
  (/)
 
 
 
 
 
  (/)
 
  (/)

Shr–Si 

  (/)
 
  (/)
 
 
 
 
 
 
 
 
  (/)
 
  (//)
  (/)
 
 
 
 
 
  (/)
 
 
  (/) 
 
 
 
 
 
  (/)
  (/)
  (/)
 
 
 
  (/)
 
  (/)
  (/)
 
  (/)
 
 
 
  (/)
 
 
 
  (/)
 
 
 
  (//)
 
 
 

Sk–Sot 

  (/)
  (//)
 
 
 
  (/)
 
  (/)
 
 
 
  (/)
  (/)
 
 
  (/)
 
 

 
 
 

 
 
  (//)
  (/)
 
 
 
 
  (/)
 
 
  (/)
 
 
 
 
 
 
 
 
 
 
 
 
 
 
 
 
 
 
  (/)
 
  (/)
 
  (/)
  (/, /)
 
 
  (/, /)

Sou–Sp 

  (/)
 
 
  (1780, /)
 
 
 
  (/)
  (/)
 
 
 
 
 
 
 
  (/)
 
  (/)
 
 
 
 
  (/)
 
 
 
 
  (/)
 
  (/)
 
  (/)
 
  (/)
 
 
 
 
 
 
 
  (/)
 
  (/)
  (//)
 
 
  (1862)
 
 
  (///)
 
 
 
 
 
  (/)
 
  (//)
  (/, /)
 
 
 

Sq–Sta 

 
 
 
  (//)
 
  (/)
 
 
 
 
 
 
  (/)
  (//)
 
  
 
  (/)
 
 
 
 
  (/, /)
  (SP-1457)
 
 
 
 
  (/)
 
 
  (/)
 
  (/)
  (/)
  (/)
  (/, /)
  (/)
 
 
 
  (//)
 
 
 
 
 
 
 
  (/)
 
 
 
 
  (//)
  (/)
 

Ste–Stu 

 
  (/)
  (/)
 
 
  (/)
  (/)
 
 
 
 
 
 
 
 
 
  (/)
 
 
 
 
 
 
 
 
 
 
 
  (/)
 
 
 
 
 
 
 
 
  (/)
 
 
 
 
 
 
 
 
 
  (/)
  (/)
 
 
  (/)
  (/)
  (/)
  (/)
  (//)
 
 
 
 
  (/)
 
 
  (/)

Su 

  (/)
 
  (/)
 
 
 
 
  (/)
 
 
  (/)
 
  (/)
 
 
  (/)
 
 
  (/)
 
 
 
  (/)
 
  (/)
 
  (/)
  (/, /)
 
 
 
  (//)
 
  (1777, /)
 
 
 
 
 
 
  (/, /)
 
  (//)
 
 
 
  (////)
 
  (/)
  (SP-1437, /, /)
 
 
 
 
  (/)
 
 
 
 
  (/)
  (/, HSV-2)
 
 
 
 
 
 
 
 
 
 
 
 
 
 
 

External links 
 navy.mil: List of homeports and their ships
 Dictionary of American Naval Fighting Ships
  Naval Vessel Register